The 2019–20 Nemzeti Bajnokság III is Hungary's third-level football competition. The championship was suspended due to the COVID-19 pandemic. The winners of the season were Érdi VSE, Pécsi MFC and Debreceni EAC. Pecs and Debreceni EAC were promoted. However, Érd could not meet the requirements of the Nemzeti Bajnokság II. Therefore, the second team, III. Kerületi TVE, were promoted.

On 11 July 2018, the three groups of the new season was finalised.

On 4 May 2020 season was suspended due to the COVID-19 pandemic.

Teams

Changes

Standings

West

Centre

Position by round

East

Season statistics

Top goalscorers - West

Updated to games played on 3 June 2018

See also
 2019–20 Magyar Kupa
 2020 Magyar Kupa Final
 2019–20 Nemzeti Bajnokság I
 2019–20 Nemzeti Bajnokság II

References

External links
  
  

Nemzeti Bajnokság III seasons
2019–20 in Hungarian football
Hun